Lake Langano (Oromo: Hora Langaanoo, Amharic: ላንጋኖ ሐይቅ) is a lake in the Oromia Region of Ethiopia, exactly 200 kilometers by road south of the capital, Addis Ababa, on the border between the East Shewa Zone and Arsi Zones. It is located to the east of Lake Abijatta in the Main Ethiopian Rift at an elevation of 1,585 meters.

Overview

According to figures published by the Central Statistical Agency, Lake Langano is 18 kilometers long and 16 km wide, with a surface area of 230 square kilometers and a maximum depth of 46 meters. The lake has a catchment 1600 square kilometers in size, and is drained by the Hora Kallo river which empties into the adjacent Lake Abijatta.

As it is free of Bilharzia (schistosomiasis), unlike all other freshwater lakes in Ethiopia, Lake Langano is popular with tourists and city-dwellers. The lake is brown in colour and at first sight one may think that the lake is not clean. However this is not the case, the reason for the colour is due to the richness of minerals including high sulphur levels which have led many to believe that the lake water has healing properties.   There are a number of resorts around the lake and water sports are popular.  There is a variety of wildlife around the lake, which include hippos (rare), monkeys, baboons, warthogs, and a huge variety of birds.  The area around the lake is largely deforested, however, and a large number of herders live around the area.

Two earthquakes had their epicenter near this lake, the first in 1906 (a magnitude 6.8 on the Richter scale), and the second in 1985 (magnitude 6.2). After the earthquake of 1906 there formed a 25–30 m tall geyser on Edo Laki Island on the northern part of the lake. The geyser disappeared circa 1966 – 1970, leaving a hot spring.

See also
Rift Valley lakes

Notes

External links
 Late Evening on Lake Langano Nature Soundscape

Lakes of Ethiopia
Lakes of the Great Rift Valley
Oromia Region